Paul Foley (1644/5 – 13 November 1699), also known as Speaker Foley, was the second son of Thomas Foley of Witley Court, the prominent Midlands ironmaster.

Ironmaster
He took over his father's ironworks in and around the Forest of Dean in the early 1670s and continued them until 1685 when he let them to John Wheeler and Richard Avenant, who had managed ironworks for his brother Philip Foley.  In 1692, the two brothers entered into a partnership with these managers and John Wheeler's brother, Richard.  This lasted until after Paul's death.

Gentleman

Paul Foley had the resources from his father and the profits of his ironworks to buy himself a substantial estate around Stoke Edith in Herefordshire, part of which still belongs to a descendant.  Important purchases included Stoke Edith from the trustees of Sir Henry Lingen in 1670 (made by his father), and other property from Sir Thomas Cooke in 1683. He rebuilt the house at Stoke Edith and laid out formal gardens and a park (which he had a royal licence to empark.

Politician
Paul Foley was elected MP for Hereford in 1679.  He was elected again for the same seat in 1689. He actively campaigned for the exclusion of the Duke of York from the throne.  He was imprisoned at the time of the Rye House Plot and again during the Monmouth Rebellion. However, James II later favoured him during his own later difficulties. During the reign of William III, he took an anti-court position, leading the "Country Whigs" faction with his nephew Robert Harley. During the early 1690s, he sat on several important Parliamentary committees, including being a commissioner of accounts. He was elected Speaker of the House of Commons on 14 March 1695, a post he held until his death. He was (like the Harleys and his elder brother Thomas) a Presbyterian and used his patronage rights in the Church of England to appoint clergy of that persuasion to churches.

Family
He married Mary daughter of Alderman John Lane of London.  Their eldest son was Thomas Foley.  His younger son Paul, was also briefly an MP.

Arms

References

People from Herefordshire
English ironmasters
Speakers of the House of Commons of England
People of the Rye House Plot
1640s births
1699 deaths
Year of birth uncertain

English MPs 1679
English MPs 1680–1681
English MPs 1689–1690
English MPs 1690–1695
English MPs 1695–1698
English MPs 1698–1700
Paul